During the 1986–87 English football season, Leicester City F.C. competed in the Football League First Division.

Season summary
In 1986–87 season, former Wigan Athletic boss Bryan Hamilton replaced Gordon Milne as team manager of the Foxes but it proved to be another season of struggle and in March, Alan Smith was sold to Arsenal for £800,000 even though he was loaned back to Leicester until the end of the season and Steve Lynex was sold to West Brom leaving Leicester’s strike force a bit weakened. Leicester brought in youngsters and loan-spell trialists but they did little to prevent the Foxes from relegation to the Second Division after 4 years in the top flight.

Final league table

Results
Leicester City's score comes first

Legend

Football League First Division

FA Cup

League Cup

Squad

Left club during season

References

Leicester City F.C. seasons
Leicester City